The 2023 World Para Powerlifting Championships is an upcoming powerlifting competition for athletes with a disability. It is scheduled to be held in Dubai, United Arab Emirates from 20 to 28 June.

The tournament is one of the compulsory tournaments to qualify for the 2024 Summer Paralympics in Paris, France.

References

World Para Powerlifting Championships
World Para Powerlifting Championships
World Para Powerlifting Championships
World Para Powerlifting Championships
Sports competitions in Dubai
World Para Powerlifting Championships
Para Powerlifting